ROUTE 66 Geographic Information Systems B.V. is a privately held company headquartered in Pfäffikon, Switzerland. ROUTE 66 was founded in 1992 and specializes in navigation software and hardware products.

In 1999 the company opened a software development center in Brașov, Romania. In 2005 the company moved all its research and development operations to the aforementioned location, which at that date employed 45 of the company's total of 65 employees. In 2008, the company announced 2.4 million euros in revenue. In 2010, the company had 92 employees, of which 65 were software developers. In November 2013, ROUTE 66 launched their latest app  Navigate 6.

The Nokia 6110 Navigator delivered with ROUTE 66 was the first mobile phone with on-board navigation installed as standard, apart from smartphones with their significantly larger dimensions and heavier weight.

References

Other sources

External links

Route 66 Mobile 7 for Nokia Series 60 Mobile Phones Launched in North Americafrom Geekzone

Software companies of Switzerland
GIS companies